Thomas Theodore Allsen (February 16, 1940 – February 18, 2019) was an American historian specializing in Mongolian studies.

Following the completion of a Bachelor of Arts degree in history from Portland State University in 1962, Allsen attended the University of Washington to pursue a Master of Arts in Russian studies. In 1969, Allsen graduated from the University of Oregon with a Master of Library Science degree. He completed a doctoral degree at the University of Minnesota in 1979 and began teaching at Western Kentucky University. The next year, Allsen joined the faculty of the Trenton State College History Department. 

He received a Guggenheim Fellowship in 2002, and retired from The College of New Jersey in the same year. Between 1986 and 2013, Allsen served on the editorial staff of the journal Archivum Eurasiae Medii Aevi. The journal published a Festschrift for Thomas T. Allsen in Celebration of His 75th Birthday in its 21st volume (2014–15). 

Allsen died in February 2019.

References 

1940 births
2019 deaths
21st-century American historians
21st-century American male writers
The College of New Jersey faculty
Western Kentucky University faculty
University of Minnesota alumni
University of Oregon alumni
University of Washington alumni
Portland State University alumni
Mongolists
Academic journal editors
20th-century American historians
American male non-fiction writers
20th-century American male writers